Harold Ross Harris (December 20, 1895 – July 28, 1988) was a notable American test pilot and U.S. Army Air Force officer who held 26 flying records. He made the first flight by American pilots over the Alps from Italy to France, successfully tested the world's first pressurized aircraft, was the first airman to safely escape from an aircraft by "bailing out" using a free-fall parachute. In his civilian career he helped create the first aerial application "crop dusting" business, and later retired as vice-president of Pan American Airways.

Early years
Harold R. Harris was born on 20 December 1895 in Chicago, Illinois, as a son of Ross Allen Harris and his wife Mae Plumb Harris. He showed an interest in aircraft at an early age, and at the age of 15 skipped school to attend the 1910 Los Angeles International Air Meet at Dominguez Field, the first ever air meet in the United States. As there were no aviation engineering courses yet available he studied mechanical engineering at the Throop College of Technology (later Caltech) in 1910 and 1911, graduating with a B.S.

Because of World War I, in 1916 Harold R. Harris joined a Citizens' Military Training Camp at Monterey, California, which was one of the few with an aviation unit. Enrolling there he became an engineering officer in the First Provisional Aero Squadron. When the U.S. entered the war, Harris enlisted in the Army Signal Reserve Corps at San Diego, California. He was sent to the first ground school class at the University of California Berkeley, and graduated in July 1917. After graduation he was sent to Europe for flight training where he helped set up the 8th Aviation Instruction Center for the Allied Expeditionairy Force in Foggia, Italy. After 181 minutes of dual instruction time, he soloed, and shortly afterward was named Chief Instructor for both day and night training. He served at Foggia from March to July 1918. While there Harris flew Farman and Caproni bombers. On July 25, 1918, Harris along with co-pilot George Lewis, led the first successful flight by American pilots over the Alps, crossing from Italy to France in four Caproni bombers. While based in Italy Harris also helped the United States Navy establish an aerial ferry route from Milan to Paris.

Test pilot
Following the conclusion of World War I, in September 1918 Harris was recalled to the United States and assigned as a test pilot at Wilbur Wright Field in Dayton, Ohio. He remained at Wilbur Wright Filed until 1920 when the Engineering Division was reassigned to McCook Field, near downtown Dayton. McCook field was the Army Air Service's experimental test field. There Harris was appointed Chief, Flight Test Branch, Engineering Division, US Army Air Service. At McCook Field, Harris became one of the Army's most important experimental test pilots.

On June 8, 1921, Harris became the first pilot to fly a pressurized aircraft when he successfully flew a Dayton-Wright USD-9A with an experimental pressurized cockpit. Two McCook Field test pilots had previously tried to fly the aircraft without success, including test pilot John A. Macready, who held the world altitude record in an oxygen equipped unpressurized aircraft. On August 11, 1921, Harold R. Harris flew the first airmail aircraft designed to pick up airmail sacks from the ground.

On October 20, 1922, Harris made history as the first pilot to bail out of a stricken aircraft using a free-fall parachute. Harris was flying a Loening monoplane with a modified aileron when the aileron began oscillating badly, pulling the control stick from his hands. Facing a certain crash, Harris bailed out of the stricken aircraft, landing in a backyard grape arbor at a house at 335 Troy Street in Dayton, suffering only bruises on his legs and hand from fighting with the control stick. The Loening crashed into the side yard of a house at 403 Valley Street, three blocks away. There were no injuries to anyone on the ground. For his survival, Harris was awarded the first membership in the Caterpillar Club, a club for aviators who were forced to bail out of stricken aircraft and survived. The name refers to the insect that produces the silk used in parachutes.

in 1922, before he left McCook Field, Harris graduated from the Air Corps Engineering School (a predecessor to the Air Force Institute of Technology) in Dayton, OH.

In 1923, Harris became the first pilot to fly the massive Barling Bomber, then the world's largest aircraft. Harris and his co-pilot, Lt. Muir Fairchild, would be virtually the only pilots to fly the enormous aircraft during its brief operational career.

On February 23, 1924, Harris became one of the first pilots to fly the Emile Berliner Helicopter, the U.S. Air Service's first experimental helicopter.

Unauthorized "stunt" flying was common at McCook Field, and in 1924 Harris was observed flying his DH-4 under a bridge over the Great Miami River while upside down.

In 1926 Harold R. Harris held 13 world flying records. By the conclusion of his test pilot career, Harris held 16 American and 10 world flight records.

Post test career
Harold R. Harris briefly left the military in 1926 to begin the Huff Daland Dusting Company, the world's first crop dusting company. Though he did not fly as a crop duster he had helped with the development of crop dusting while stationed at McCook Field.

In 1925 Harold R Harris testified before the Morrow Board, a review board created by President Calvin Coolidge to investigate the potential of private and commercial aviation. Harris testified that safeguards would have to be implemented to assure the safety of airline passengers that went beyond those in use on military aircraft. Harris also proposed an airline connecting the west coast of South America with the United States. In response to his suggestion, in 1929 Pan American founded Grace Airways, a joint venture between Pan American World Airways and Grace Shipping. The airline operated four Fairchild FC-2 cabin planes. At Harris' suggestion, the planes were furnished with toilets, a first for any aircraft. The FC-2s were the first aircraft carrying the American flag to fly scheduled routes south of the Equator. Between 1929 and 1939 Harris was based in Peru, where he held the position of vice-president and Chief Operations Officer of Grace Airways.

World War II
With the onset of World War II Harris was asked to go to Washington D.C. where, as a civilian, he set up the Plan Section of the Army Air Transport Command. He accepted a commission as Colonel in the Air Transport Command in 1942, resigning from Pan American Grace Airways. During the War, Harris served as Assistant Chief of Staff, Plans; Assistant Chief of Staff, Operations; Commanding Officer of Domestic Transportation Division. When he left the service in 1945 he was the Acting Chief of Staff of Air Transport Command, having attained the rank of Brigadier General.

Post-war
Harold R. Harris left the military for the second time to join American Overseas Airlines. In 1950 American Overseas Airlines was incorporated into Pan Am Airlines, and Harris became vice-president in charge of the Atlantic Division. From 1954 to 1955 Harris was president and chief executive officer of Northwest Airlines. He resigned because of health issues and conflicts with the Northwest Airlines Board of Directors. From 1955 until 1965 Harris was President of Aviation Financial Services, Inc., a company that helped fledgling airlines acquire operating capital. Harris retired in 1965 at age 70.

Harold R. Harris died in his home in Falmouth, Massachusetts on July 28, 1988, at age 92.

He was married to Grace Harris with whom he had two children: son Harold R. Harris Jr. and daughter Alta Mae Harris.

Decorations

References

External links
 

1895 births
1988 deaths
History of Dayton, Ohio
United States Army Air Forces generals
United States Army Air Service pilots of World War I
Recipients of the Distinguished Service Medal (US Army)
Recipients of the Legion of Merit
Air Force Institute of Technology alumni
American aviation record holders
United States Army Air Forces generals of World War II